Nymphs (Finnish: Nymfit) is a Finnish fantasy-drama television series. The series is based on Greek mythology as the beautiful and immortal nymphs are living in a modern-day Helsinki. The nymphs need to have sex once a month in order to stay alive and run away from satyrs that persecute them.

Gummerus is publishing Nymfit as a book series. The first part of the book was written by Sari Luhtanen and Miikko Oikkonen and was titled Nymfit – Montpellierin legenda (Nymphs – The Legend of Montpellier). The Finnish version of the book was published August 29, 2013 in Finland. The translation rights have been sold internationally.

Cast 
Sara Soulié as Didi Tasson
Manuela Bosco as Nadia Rapaccini
Rebecca Viitala as Kati Ordana
Ilkka Villi as Erik Mann
Jarkko Niemi as Samuel Koski
Malla Malmivaara as Frida Fredriksdottir
Pelle Heikkilä as Jesper
Svante Martin as Kari Harju
Lauri Tilkanen as Mitchell Brannegan
Robin Svartström as Valtteri Vaara
Hannes Mikkelsson as Lucas Pascal
Kai Vaine as Heikki Hannula
Elina Vehkaoja as Laura Maasalo
Ville Virtanen as Matias van der Haas
Johanna af Schultén as Elina Tiensuu
Jemina Sillanpää as Jamila
Esko Roine as Roland Gyllen
Mikko Leppilampi as Gabriel Korda
Max Ovaska as Johannes Metso
Outi Condit as Rose
Miina Turunen as Lecturer
Amira Khalifa as Aurelia
Minka Kuustonen as Jessica
Jasmin Hamid as Ana-Claudia

References

External links 

Nymphs at Finnish MTV3 channel site
Nymphs at Fisher King production company site

2010s Finnish television series
Finnish drama television series
Helsinki in fiction
2014 Finnish television series debuts
MTV3 original programming
AVA (TV channel) original programming